Tabitha Soren (born August 19, 1967) is an American fine art photographer and former reporter for MTV News, ABC News and NBC News.

Early career
As a 19-year-old college student at NYU, Soren appeared in the 1987 music video for "(You Gotta) Fight for Your Right (to Party)" by the Beastie Boys. At the age of 23, she was the face of MTV's Choose or Lose campaign, which focused on encouraging young adults to vote. The campaign received a Peabody Award in May, 1992. She interviewed Hillary Clinton, Anita Hill and Yasser Arafat, among others. She had cameo roles in the films The Cable Guy and Contact as herself. Clips of her interviews with Tupac Shakur were included in the 2003 documentary film Tupac: Resurrection.

Later career 
After working in television news, Soren spent a year studying art and photography at Stanford University.

Soren's projects have been published in The New York Times Magazine, Canteen, Vanity Fair, McSweeney's, Sports Illustrated, and New York, among others. Public collections include the Los Angeles County Museum of Art, Oakland Museum of California, the New Orleans Museum of Art, [ier 24 Photography, Transformer Station in Ohio, and the Ogden Museum of Southern Art in Louisiana.

In 2012, her show Running appeared at the Indianapolis Museum of Contemporary Art. A three-year-long project shot in 15 states, as well as in Mexico and Canada, Running featured dramatically lit, isolated individuals running in everyday settings.

In 2015, Soren's exhibition Fantasy Life debuted at the Kopeikin Gallery in Los Angeles and traveled to the San Francisco Bay Area. The exhibition showcased images of 21 baseball players selected for the Oakland A's 2002 draft class, whom Soren followed for thirteen years until they were out of baseball. Later that same year, Soren exhibited Panic Beach, a photographic series of rugged, powerful waves along coastlines all over the world.

In 2017, the Aperture Foundation published a selection of Soren's Fantasy Life photographs, with text by Dave Eggers. The book was released just prior to a major exhibition at San Francisco City Hall also titled Fantasy Life, which displayed over 180 of Soren's images. Also in summer of 2017, EUQINOMprojects in San Francisco exhibited work from the Surface Tension series, in which all images were photographed using 8 x 10 sheets of film. The gallery also showcases photographs from her project, As Far As You Know.

Personal life
Soren married author Michael Lewis in 1997. They have three children: Quinn, Dixie, and Walker.

On May 25, 2021, Soren’s daughter Dixie was involved in a head-on collision with a semi truck near Truckee, California. Dixie was pronounced dead at the scene.

References

External links

1967 births
Living people
American television reporters and correspondents
Hampton High School (Virginia) alumni
New York University alumni
People from San Antonio
American women television journalists
Journalists from New York City
Journalists from Texas
American women photographers
21st-century American women artists
21st-century American photographers
Photographers from Texas
Photographers from New York City
Fine art photographers